Hulked Out Heroes is a 2-issue comic book crossover mini-series, written by Jeff Parker and published by Marvel Comics in June 2010. It is part of the "World War Hulks" crossover storyline.

The series stars Hulk, Red Hulk, and includes some of The Avengers in a "Hulked" form, including Wolverine, Captain America, Spider-Man and Thor. In addition, a "Hulkified" Deadpool called "Hulkpool" serves as the antagonist alongside Doc Samson and the Intelligencia.

Plot summary
Bob, Agent of HYDRA (at this point working for A.I.M.) sends Hulkpool (a gamma-powered Deadpool) back in time so he can kill his original Deadpool incarnation for being an unrepentant murderer, using the machine Red Hulk used to send Thundra to the future. However, Hulkpool instead meets with a Blackbeard version of the Thing after Bob inadvertently sends him back to the year 1717. After preventing a storm from sinking the pirate ship and sending away Johnny and Reed (who were trying to get to the Thing), he becomes a pirate as First Mate under Captain Blackbeard-Thing until the British Royal Navy attacks their ship with a summoned Kraken.
He and the Thing attempt to defeat it, but are sent to the Savage Land in the present day due to Bob's interference. There they encounter Devil Dinosaur and Moon Boy, and after mistakenly assuming that they were sent to prehistoric times, Thing asks if Bob can get him back to his original time period. Hulkpool affirms his request and has Bob initiate another timejump to take Ben Grimm back, taking Devil Dinosaur and Moon Boy with him.
They then arrive in the Old West in 1873, where Hawkeye is lost in time, and Devil Dinosaur becomes unhinged and starts running havoc. However, Bob sends them back in time to prehistory (and the Thing back to his pirate age), but Hulkpool is sent to the point in time at the end of WW2 when Captain America lost Bucky in a missile explosion and decides to save Bucky. 
While in this alternate reality's version of World War II, Hulkpool aids Captain America and Bucky in hunting down and killing that reality's versions of Adolf Hitler and the Red Skull. After Bob tries to transport him through time once more, he ignorantly manages to prevent the origin stories of numerous superheroes (including the original Hulk). He ultimately succeeds in killing the Deadpool of this (alternate) timeline and returns to the main Marvel universe at the end.

Collected editions
The series is collected into a trade paperback, together with the miniseries World War Hulks: Captain America vs. Wolverine and World War Hulks: Spider-Man vs. Thor.

 Hulk: World War Hulks - Hulked-Out Heroes (112 pages, softcover, July 2010).

In other media

In the episode "Gamma World" of Avengers: Earth's Mightiest Heroes, the Avengers and the population of Nevada are getting mutated by massive amounts of gamma radiation in a plot by the Leader to create a mutated army; however, instead of "Hulking out", everyone's mutations are completely random.

The first season of Avengers Assemble adapts the storyline in an episode of the same name. The Avengers are hit with a gamma transformation bomb sent by MODOK and Redskull to change the Avengers into Hulk like monsters. The transformation is rigged to overload the Avengers and cause them to explode when they get angry. Hulk manages to calm them long enough to use an energy draining device to restore them.

References

External links
 Hulked-Out Heroes at Marvel.com